David Alexander Ewing (June 1881 – June 1926) was an English professional footballer who played in the Football League for Chesterfield Town as a left back.

Career 
After beginning his career in non-League football, Ewing moved to Second Division club Chesterfield Town in 1907. He made 35 appearances and scored one goal during the 1907–08 season, before joining Southern League First Division club Brentford in 1908. He was a near ever-present during the 1908–09 season and after spells with Huddersfield Town, Castleford Town and Machen, he ended his career back in the Southern League with Queens Park Rangers and Newport County prior to the First World War.

Career statistics

References

English footballers
Brentford F.C. players
English Football League players
Association football fullbacks
Worksop Town F.C. players
Chesterfield F.C. players
Southern Football League players
1881 births
People from Elsecar
Huddersfield Town A.F.C. players
Castleford Town F.C. players
Queens Park Rangers F.C. players
Midland Football League players
Newport County A.F.C. players
Workington A.F.C. players
1926 deaths